Zheludyevo is a rural locality (a village) in Nagornoye Rural Settlement, Petushinsky District, Vladimir Oblast, Russia. The population was 21 as of 2010. There are 2 streets.

Geography 
Zheludyevo is located on the Sheredar River, 28 km northwest of Petushki (the district's administrative centre) by road. Voskresenye is the nearest rural locality.

References 

Rural localities in Petushinsky District